is a Japanese politician serving in the House of Representatives in the Diet (national legislature) as a member of the Democratic Party of Japan. A native of Nakakubiki District, Niigata and graduate of Waseda University he was elected for the first time in 1990 as a member of the Japan Socialist Party after an unsuccessful run in 1986.

In 2012, the Yomiuri Shimbun reported that Tsutsui had divulged secret information to a Chinese agricultural enterprise. Tsutsui sued the newspaper for libel, and was awarded 3.3 million yen in damages in 2015 on the basis that the truth of the allegations could not be confirmed.

References

External links
  Official website

Living people
1944 births
Democratic Party of Japan politicians
Social Democratic Party (Japan) politicians
Members of the House of Representatives (Japan)
21st-century Japanese politicians